Jesse Nealand Stone Jr. (June 17, 1924 – May 14, 2001), was an African-American Louisiana attorney who was appointed as an associate justice pro tempore of the Louisiana Supreme Court.

See also
List of African-American jurists

References

1924 births
2001 deaths
African-American lawyers
20th-century American lawyers
Louisiana lawyers
Louisiana Democrats
Justices of the Louisiana Supreme Court
Educators from Louisiana
People from Baton Rouge, Louisiana
People from Shreveport, Louisiana
People from Gibsland, Louisiana
Southern University alumni
Southern University Law Center alumni
Activists for African-American civil rights
20th-century American judges
20th-century African-American people